Nicolas Alan Barillaro is a Canadian director, animator and writer at Pixar best known for his work on the animated short film Piper, that earned him widespread acclaim and an Academy Award for Best Animated Short Film which he shared with the film's producer Marc Sondheimer.

Barillaro also attended Sheridan College in Oakville.

Piper
Alan Barillaro used new, cutting edge technology to create the six-minute short over three years.  In order to give the sanderlings and other birds visible in the background a realistic look, Barillaro and the Piper animation team visited beaches in the San Francisco Bay Area, as well as the Monterey Bay Aquarium to study their appearance and behaviour.  The sanderlings' feathers in particular were rendered in minute detail.

Filmography

Accolades

See also
 List of Pixar staff
 List of Canadian Academy Award winners and nominees

References

External links
 
 

Canadian animated film directors
Canadian animated film producers
Directors of Best Animated Short Academy Award winners
Living people
Pixar people
Year of birth missing (living people)